A Lady in Love is a 1920 American silent drama film directed by Walter Edwards and written by Alice Eyton based upon a play of the same name by Harriet Ford and Caroline Duer. The film stars Ethel Clayton, Harrison Ford, Boyd Irwin, Clarence Geldart, Elsa Lorimer, and Ernest Joy. The film was released on May 30, 1920, by Paramount Pictures. It is not known whether the film currently survives.

Plot
As described in a film magazine, Barbara (Clayton) elopes from covenant school with Barton Sedgewick (Irwin), the rascally younger brother of her guardian George Sedgewick (Geldart). She soon discovers that Barton has another wife and child living. He also fears arrest for some frauds in which he was involved and flees the country. Barbara goes to live with George and his wife Clara (Lorimer). The latter has a secret admirer in Gilbert Rhodes (Joy), who is also a secret partner in Barton's crooked schemes. Barbara finds herself in love with a fine upstanding lawyer named Brent (Ford). When Barbara learns that Clara is planning to run away with Gilbert, she follows the woman to Rhodes' rooms and discovers Barton hiding there. She obtains evidence freeing herself from the marriage vows, which paves the future with happiness for her and Brent.

Cast
 Ethel Clayton as Barbara Martin
 Harrison Ford as Brent
 Boyd Irwin as Barton Sedgewick
 Clarence Geldart as George Sedgewick
 Elsa Lorimer as Clara Sedgewick
 Ernest Joy as Gilbert Rhodes
 Ernee Goodleigh as Anna
 Frances Raymond as Mrs. Sedgewick

References

External links 
 
 

1920 films
1920s English-language films
Silent American drama films
1920 drama films
Paramount Pictures films
American black-and-white films
American silent feature films
Films directed by Walter Edwards
1920s American films